AmberSky Gdańsk is a 50-meter tall Ferris wheel in Gdańsk. It opened to the public in June 2016. It changed locations and reopened to the public on December 1, 2018. It is different from the Ferris wheel owned by Oscar Bruch from Germany that operated seasonally in Gdańsk before AmberSky's construction.

Design 

The Netherlands-based Dutch Wheels designed and constructed the wheel. It is a model R50SP-36. It has 36 climate controlled gondolas that can accommodate eight people each. A VIP gondola features a glass floor. It weighs 440 tonnes.

References 

9. Ubisoft, Operation Amber Sky Retrieved 2021-01-25.

Ferris wheels
Tourist attractions in Gdańsk